Hnúšťa is a town and municipality in the Rimavská Sobota District of the Banská Bystrica Region of southern Slovakia.
It is the birthplace of the well-known 19th-century Slovak writer and member of the Štúr generation, Ján Francisci-Rimavský. He is commemorated by a statue and a plaque near the town's main square.

History
The town was first mentioned in 1334.

Geography
It is located in the Slovenské rudohorie mountains, in the Rimava river valley near Rimavská Sobota.

Demographics
According to the 2001 census, 93.12% of inhabitants were Slovaks, 3.36% Roma, 1.07% Hungarians and 0.40% Czechs. The religious make-up was 36.40% Roman Catholics, 21.62% Lutherans and 35.44% people with no religious affiliation.

Economy
A factory for the production of chemicals was one of the main employers in Hnúšťa region. Now several middle sized companies are located in the town industrial park. The local shopping center attract visitors from neighbouring villages.

Notable people
Ján Francisci-Rimavský, Slovak poet, member of Štúr generation
Ľudovít Kaník, politician

Twin towns — sister cities

Hnúšťa is twinned with:
 Dobruška, Czech Republic
 Lwówek Śląski, Poland

See also
List of municipalities and towns in Slovakia

References

External links
 
 
Surnames of living people in Hnusta

Cities and towns in Slovakia
Villages and municipalities in Rimavská Sobota District